Kadavanthra is a downtown region and a major commercial centre in Kochi City, with a close vicinity to  the city's biggest  railway station 'Ernakulam Junction'  and Kochi's commercial high street the M.G.Road, in the Indian state of Kerala.

Surroundings 
Kadavanthra Junction is a major intersection in Kochi, one of the busiest in the city. The junction facilitates Kadavanthra Metro Station, catering to passengers for Panampilly Nagar/Kadavanthra area.

The junction is an intersection of Kochi City's main arterial Sahodaran Ayyappan Road (east-west) with arterial Kaloor-Kadavanthra Road (north-south) and K.P.Vallon Road (north-south). This junction  enhances rail connectivity from M.G Road to Vytilla Mobility Hub.

Kadavanthra is part of Kochi's central business district located in central Kochi area. It is notable as home for the headquarters of the Greater Cochin Development Authority, the statutory body overseeing the development of the city of Kochi. NIA (National Investigation Agency) is also located in Kadavanthra. The Kochi Metro Kadavanthra station is situated in front of GCDA lawns. Kendriya Vidyalaya (KV), Soften Technologies, Bhavans Vidya Mandir and St Josephs Upper Primary School are located in this area.

The region is an emerging commercial high street with branded retail stores and many 3- and 5-star hotels such as Olive Downtown, Radisson Blu Kochi, Avenue Centre Hotel, Star Paradise, Park Residency hotel and Cochin Palace hotel. Affluent housing colonies include Panampilly Nagar, Giri Nagar, Gandhi Nagar and Jawahar Nagar. Central Bank of India, HDFC Bank, South Indian Bank, State Bank of India and Axis Bank branches are present.
 
 

It is close to the South Railway Station, with easy access to Kaloor, Vyttila and Cochin International Airport. Kaloor-Kadavanthra Road links northern and southern parts of Kochi. Kadavanthra became a major hub following the completion of Kaloor-Kadavanthra Road. The presence of the Ernakulam Junction Railway Station and residential colonies raise real estate prices. Kadavanthra provides access to Cochin Shipyard and the naval base. It provides alternate access to Atlantis via Railway gate or Thevara Junction, thus avoiding the usually busy M.G Road.

Facilities 
Major centres in and around Kadavanthra include:

 Kadavanthra metro station.
The Regional Sports Centre (RSC) Rajiv Gandhi International Indoor Stadium
The Greater Cochin Development Authority (GCDA)
Statue of Sahodaran Ayyappan in the S.A Road.
National Investigation Agency.
Office of Kerala State Electricity Board (KSEB)
 Facets Dental Clinics
Office of the Housing Development Authority in Panampilly Nagar
The Kadavanthra Post Office on Cheruparambath Road
The Passport office in Panampilly Nagar
Panampilly Nagar has a separate post office
Supplyco of the Civil Supplies Department, Government of Kerala in Gandhinagar
Kadavanthra Janamytri Police Station
Fire Station
BSNL office
 Indra Gandhi Co-operative Hospital 
Akshaya Hospital
Giridhar Hospital
Lotus Eye Hospital 
Kendriya Vidyalaya (Central School)
Office of Health Inspector
Elamkulam village office
The Vijaya Hospital
The State Bank of India, Ernakulam South Branch is in S.A Road
The Bank of Baroda
The Federal Bank
Offices of Airtel, Reliance, Tata Indicom, Vodafone in S.A Road
Maannullil Builders Enterprises in S.A.Road
 "Kallelil Building" in S.A.Road, accommodates Central Bank of India (Kadavanthra Branch).
 Indian Overseas Bank ATM is in "Kallelil Building" Kadavanthra.
 Asset Luminaire
 Olive Downtown Hotel- 5 star luxury hotel
 Olive Builder Luxury Apartments in Cochin http://www.olivebuilder.com/projects/olive-heights situated at the heart of kadavanthara.
 
 Radisson Blu Kochi-5 star luxury hotel
 Newsport.in 
 ABAD Builders Knightsbridge Apartments 
 ABAD Builders Silver Crest Flats 
 DD Vyapar Bhavan
 SMEC Automation Pvt Ltd.
 DD Milestone & Cornerstone.
Kochi Builders Circle
 Tulsi Capitol Pointe Apartments
 Trinity Citadel Apartments
 Dreamflower Casa Gardenza
 Dreamflower Cynosure
 Traum Academy for Foreign languages
 Kalyan Marvella by Kalyan Developers.
Scuba Cochin
 SMS HABITAT Apartments by SMS Builders
 SMS SERINITY Apartments by SMS Builders
 SMS INFINITY Apartments by SMS Builders
 URVI Concepts - Architects & Interior Designers
 JGT Living Spaces - Samrudhi Luxury Apartments

Location

References

Neighbourhoods in Kochi
Wikipedia external links cleanup from June 2018